Colin Maurice Jillings (11 March 1931 – 23 December 2022) was a New Zealand Thoroughbred horse racing trainer from the early 1950s until his retirement in September 2005. He was inducted into the New Zealand Racing Hall of Fame in 2008.

Early life and career
Jillings was born in Auckland on 11 March 1931. He became an apprentice jockey at Ellerslie Racecourse at the age of 12 in 1943. After riding track work at Ellerslie each morning, he would catch the train to school at St Peter's College. 

He was a successful apprentice jockey before increasing weight brought a premature end to a promising career.  His biggest success as an apprentice was the 1946 Railway Stakes aboard Royal Scot, a race he would later win three times as a trainer.

Training career
When he retired he had amassed a total of 1327 New Zealand winners, 703 of those with long time training partner Richard Yuill.

When asked to name the best horse he ever trained Jillings had no hesitation in labelling Stipulate, the champion stayer of his era in the early 1960s. The fact that he had no hesitation in labelling Stipulate speaks volumes for the regard Jillings had for the horse given that he also trained the super little horse of the early 1980's – McGinty. 

Jillings' biggest success came when he trained The Phantom Chance to win the 1993 W. S. Cox Plate. Although operating with a smaller team than most other trainers, Jillings managed to keep producing top horses year after year. 

He trained the first of four Auckland Cup winners in 1956 Yeman, followed by Stipulate (1963), Perhaps (1976) and Irish Chance (in partnership with Richard Yuill) in 1999. He also achieved the unique record of training a Derby winner in each of the last 5 decades of the 20th Century: his first Derby winner being Lawful (1958) followed by Stipulate (1960),  Uncle Remus (1977), I'm Henry (1983) and The Phantom Chance (1992).

Notable horses

Notable horses he trained included: 

 Athenia, winner of the 1978 New Zealand Oaks for his good friend T.J. (Tommy) Smith
 Beauzami, winner of the 1963 New Zealand Cup
 Diamond Lover, winner of the 1987 Railway Stakes
 I'm Henry, winner of the New Zealand Derby, Avondale Guineas, Great Northern Guineas, Wellington Derby and Waikato Guineas in the 1983/84 season
 Irish Chance, winner of the 1999 Auckland Cup
 McGinty, winner of the Air New Zealand Stakes (twice), Rawson Stakes, Canterbury Guineas, Caulfield Stakes and George Adams Handicap
 Old Son, winner of the Ellerslie Sires Produce Stakes for himself and his good friend, Pukekohe market gardener, Pabu Daya
 Perhaps, winner of the 1976 Auckland Cup
 Pipe Dream, winner of the 1962 Railway Stakes
 Sedecrem, winner of 2004 and 2005 Waikato Sprint and the 2003 Easter Handicap  
 Sharivari, winner of the 1971 Railway Stakes
 Stipulate, winner of the 1960 New Zealand Derby (Riccarton) and 1963 Auckland Cup
 Sugaratariat, winner of the Ellerslie Sires Produce Stakes
 The Phantom Chance, winner of the 1992 New Zealand Derby and the 1993 Turnbull Stakes and Cox Plate
 Tycoon Lil, winner of the 1997 New Zealand 1000 Guineas, 1998 New Zealand Oaks & Canterbury Guineas.  Also 2nd and 3rd behind Might And Power in the 1998 Yalumba Stakes and Cox Plate
  Uncle Remus, winner of the 1977 New Zealand 2000 Guineas and New Zealand Derby
 Yeman, winner of the 1956 Auckland Cup and 1958 Wellington Cup

Jumping

In his earlier years from limited runners, he was also a noted trainer of jumpers, winning:
 the 1959 Grand National Hurdles with Armed (owned by himself)
 the 1971 Great Northern Hurdles/Steeples double and the 1972 Great Northern Steeplechase, with Brockton (for great friend, Wellington businessman, Doug Tse) 
 the 1987 Great Northern Steeples with Deductable, in partnership with Richard Yuill (with both sharing the ownership).

Apprentices

Jillings was also a noted mentor of apprentices, the best being his long time stable jockey Bob Vance who was the rider of: 

 McGinty.
 3 New Zealand Derby winners for Jillings: Uncle Remus, I'm Henry and The Phantom Chance. He also won the Derby with Isle Of Man for Davina Waddell.
 The Phantom Chance in the Cox Plate.

Vance won the NZ Jockeys Premiership, as an apprentice (1977/78) and had a successful career riding internationally in Hong Kong and Macau. 

Other apprentices for Jillings were:

 Samantha Spratt: one of NZ's most successful female riders. 
 Mark Sweeney: 2 Auckland Cup wins. 
 Daniel Southworth: winner of the 1977 New Zealand 1000 Guineas and 1976 Railway Stakes.

Retirement and death
Jillings' final race-day runner was Cheval De Troy who finished last behind Makybe Diva in the 2005 The BMW at Rosehill.

Jillings died in Auckland on 23 December 2022, at the age of 91.

See also

 Thoroughbred racing in New Zealand

References

Sources
 
 

1931 births
2022 deaths
New Zealand jockeys
New Zealand racehorse trainers
New Zealand Racing Hall of Fame inductees
People educated at St Peter's College, Auckland
Sportspeople from Auckland